Erich Bloedorn (6 July 1902 – 30 November 1975) was a German Luftwaffe bomber pilot and recipient of the Knight's Cross of the Iron Cross during World War II.  The Knight's Cross of the Iron Cross was awarded to recognise extreme battlefield bravery or successful military leadership.

Life 
Bloedorn studied at the University of Königsberg and became a member of the Corps Masovia in summer 1921. In 1924 he gave up studying and joined the Reichswehr in Allenstein, Masuria. When he was lieutenant in the :de:2. (Preußisches) Infanterie-Regiment (Reichswehr) in Lötzen he made a bet: to reach Istanbul via Munich within 10 days, alone by motorcycle. He did and the German embassy gave a function.

He retired major from the Reichswehr in 1930 to serve on the General Staff of former Generaloberst Hans von Seeckt, who served as a military advisor to Chiang Kai-shek in Nanking and Shanghai. In 1936 Bloedorn joined the Luftwaffe and served as Hauptmann in Berlin. In 1940 he became Geschwaderkommodore of the Adler-Geschwader which flew air raids in France, the Netherlands, England, Scapa Flow and Norway and sank the Convoy PQ 17.

Having fought in the North African Campaign Bloedorn was promoted Oberstleutnant and assigned to Albert Kesselring in 1943. In Bucharest he witnessed the breakdown of the pro-German Romanian army and the coup of Michael I of Romania. As Oberst he returned to Kesselring until the end of the war. After the war Bloedorn built up a civil existence in publishing of scientific literature. He was married to Dr. med. Ursula Bloedorn. Their daughter Gisa is living in Ansbach, their son Arne in Rheine.

Awards
 Flugzeugführerabzeichen
 Front Flying Clasp of the Luftwaffe
 Iron Cross (1939)
 2nd Class
 1st Class
 Knight's Cross of the Iron Cross on 13 October 1940 as Major and Gruppenkommandeur of the III./Kampfgeschwader 4 "General Wever"
 German Cross in Gold on 2 September 1942 as Major in Kampfgeschwader 30

References

Citations

Bibliography

External links
Ritterkreuztraeger 1939–1945
TracesOfWar.com

1902 births
1975 deaths
People from Mühlhausen
Luftwaffe pilots
German World War II pilots
Recipients of the Gold German Cross
Recipients of the Knight's Cross of the Iron Cross
People from the Province of Saxony
University of Königsberg alumni
Military personnel from Thuringia